Escadrille Spa.84 (originally Escadrille N.84) was a French fighter squadron active in World War I during 1917 and 1918. They were credited with destroying 24 German airplanes and one observation balloon.

History

Escadrille Spa.84 was founded on 6 January 1917 at Ravenal, France. It was principally equipped with Nieuport 24s, though it had some SPAD S.7s. On 22 March, it was incorporated into Groupe de Combat 13, posted to III Armee. The groupe would be exchanged between armies half a dozen times during the course of the war.

By February 1918, the unit had become Escadrille Spa.84 because it was wholly outfitted with SPAD 13 fighters. It was Mentioned in dispatches on 10 September 1918. By the Armistice on 11 November 1918, it was credited with destruction of 24 German airplanes and an observation balloon.

Commanding officers

 Lieutenant Paul Gastin: 6 January 1917 - 28 July 1917
 Lieutenant Andre Humieres: 28 July 1917 - 6 November 1917
 Lieutenant Paul Gastin: 6 November 1917 - 28 August 1918
 Sous lieutenant Pierre Wertheim: 28 August 1918 - 11 November 19188

Notable members

 Sous lieutenant Omer Demeuldre
 Sous lieutenant Pierre Wertheim

Aircraft

 Nieuport 24s: 6 January 1917 - early 1918
 SPAD S.7s: 6 January 1917 - early 1918
 SPAD 13s: Early 1918

End notes

Reference
 Franks, Norman; Bailey, Frank (1993). Over the Front: The Complete Record of the Fighter Aces and Units of the United States and French Air Services, 1914–1918 London, UK: Grub Street Publishing. .

Fighter squadrons of the French Air and Space Force
Military units and formations established in 1917
Military units and formations disestablished in 1918
Military units and formations of France in World War I
Military aviation units and formations in World War I